Dreyfus is a 1931 British film on the Dreyfus affair, translated from the play by Wilhelm Herzog and Hans Rehfisch and the 1930 German film Dreyfus. It features George Zucco in his film debut.

Cast
Cedric Hardwicke as Capt. Alfred Dreyfus
Charles Carson as Col. Picquart
George Merritt as Émile Zola
Sam Livesey as Labori
Beatrix Thomson as Lucille Dreyfus
Garry Marsh as Maj. Esterhazy
Randle Ayrton as Court-martial president
Henry Caine as Col. Hubert-Joseph Henry
Reginald Dance as President, Zola trial
George Skillan as Maj. Armand du Paty de Clam
Leonard Shepherd as Georges Clemenceau
Arthur Hardy as Gen. Auguste Mercier
Alexander Sarner as Mathieu Dreyfus
Frederick Leister as Edgar Demange
J. Fisher White as Georges-Gabriel de Pellieux
Abraham Sofaer as Dubois
J. Leslie Frith as  Alphonse Bertillon
George Zucco as Jacques Marie Eugène Godefroy Cavaignac

See also
Dreyfus (1930)

External links

1931 films
1930s historical drama films
Films about the Dreyfus affair
British multilingual films
British remakes of German films
British historical drama films
Cultural depictions of Alfred Dreyfus
Cultural depictions of Émile Zola
Cultural depictions of Georges Clemenceau
British black-and-white films
1931 multilingual films
1931 drama films
Films shot at British International Pictures Studios
1930s English-language films
1930s British films